On June 24, 2022, the first round of local body elections were held in 14 districts of Sindh. According to the results, the Pakistan People's Party has won 225 seats in the municipal committee. GDA has won 18 seats while 19 independents have won, PTI has won 14 and JUI has won 7 seats while other parties have won two seats.

Second phase
Held on 15 January 2023.

Hyderabad

2023 Karachi local government elections

See also
 Local government in Pakistan

References

2022 in Pakistan
2022 in Sindh
2022 elections in Pakistan
June 2022 events in Pakistan
Local elections in Pakistan
Politics of Sindh
Sindh